Pearl Modiadie (born December 29, 1987) is a South African television presenter, radio DJ, actress and producer best known to TV audiences for presenting the SABC1 music talk show Zaziwa.

Life and career

1987-2009: Early life and education
Pearl Modiadie was born in Xubeni section of Tembisa township in Ekurhuleni in the Gauteng province of South Africa.

Modiadie went to Norkem Park High School in Kempton Park in Ekurhuleni, Gauteng and matriculated in 2005. In 2007 she enrolled at Rosebank College to study a diploma in Media Studies and Journalism.

In 2009 Pearl Modiadie completed her diploma at Rosebank College.

Career 
She was previously best known for presenting the e.tv kids programming block Craz-e. In 2007 she co-hosted the kids game show Crazed Out.

She was also a DJ at YFM and was the content producer for the Television Series Sistahood, which she also hosted until April 2012.

Early 2013 she made her debut on the e.tv soapie Scandal! as Kefilwe Malope, a feisty young girl with a track record of drug abuse and ulterior motives.

She later began hosting the SABC1 music lifestyle show Zaziwa, which gives viewers a chance to get to know their favourite celebrities through the music that has helped shape their lives.

She is a regular field presenter on SABC 3's breakfast show Expresso. She is also hosting at Metro FM alongside Thomas Msengane every weekday during 12pm-3pm.

In 2015 she was one of the 10 celebrity contestants on the eighth season of the reality competition series Strictly Come Dancing. She was partnered with professional dancer Grant Esterhuizen.

Personal life
She gave a birth to a baby boy named Lewatle Olivier in September 2020. Modiadie has two sisters Dambuza Sina Sibuyi (41) and Tebogo Penelope Modiadie (25). She has one niece and two nephews named Naledi Gugulethu Mkhonto (17), Nkateko Lesedi Mkhonto (12), and Oratile Percy Modiadie (5).

Filmography

References

External links
 

1987 births
Living people
South African DJs
South African television actresses
South African television presenters
South African women television presenters
Electronic dance music DJs